Ben Breeze (born 8 April 1974, in Exeter) is an English born rugby union player who represented England U21, England Students and England 7's, as well as Wales A and Wales 7's. A winger or fullback, he played his club rugby for Bristol (1995–1999), Newport RFC (1999–2003), Newport Gwent Dragons (2003–2006) and Exeter Chiefs (2006–2010).

Rugby career 
On 25 March 2016 he coached and played for Rwanda at the GFI Rugby Tens in Hong Kong, technically making him a triple international.

Breeze now heads up Stephen Lansdown's "Bristol Sport Foundation", having reformed the Bristol Rugby Community Foundation in 1996, restructuring it as a charity in 2010.

In 2015, he was presented with a ten-year Special Achievement Award by Premiership Rugby and All Party Parliamentary Group at the Houses of Parliament.

References

External links
Newport Gwent Dragons profile
Bristol Sport Foundation website

1974 births
Living people
Bristol Bears players
Dragons RFC players
English rugby union players
Exeter Chiefs players
Newport RFC players
Rugby union players from Exeter
Rugby union fullbacks
Rugby union wings